Tod Goldberg (born January 10, 1971 in Berkeley, California) is an American author and journalist best known for his novels Gangster Nation (Counterpoint), Gangsterland (Counterpoint) and Living Dead Girl (Soho Press), the popular Burn Notice series (Penguin/NAL) and the short story collection The Low Desert: Gangster Stories (Counterpoint).

Early life and education
A Jewish author, he graduated from Palm Springs High School in 1989. He attended California State University, Northridge earning a BA in English. In 2009, he graduated with a master's in fine arts degree in creative writing & literature from Bennington College.

Goldberg describes himself as “profoundly” dyslexic. At six years old, he was told by a doctor that he would never read or write beyond a fourth-grade level.

Career
Goldberg's second novel, Living Dead Girl, was a finalist for the 2003 Los Angeles Times Book Prize for best mystery and was featured as one of January Magazine'''s top novels of 2002. His third book, Simplify, culled stories from the past decade of his career into one volume, the first published by OV Books, the book publishing arm of the literary journal Other Voices. It received notable reviews in numerous publications, including the Los Angeles Times, Chicago Tribune, The Washington Post and Chicago Sun-Times and was named a 2006 finalist for the Southern California Booksellers Association Award in Fiction. His next book of short stories, Other Resort Cities,  was released in October 2009 by OV Books to wide acclaim, including a positive review from the Los Angeles Times.

He is also the author of original novels based on the USA Network TV series Burn Notice. The novels include The Fix, The End Game, The Giveaway, The Reformed, and The Bad Beat. In 2013, his essay "When They Let Them Bleed" was selected for Best American Essays, edited by Cheryl Strayed. Counterpoint published Gangsterland in September 2014 to rave reviews, earning starred notices in Publishers Weekly, Booklist, and Kirkus. The novel was named a finalist for the Hammett Prize, recognizing the excellence in the field of crime writing.

In 2012, Goldberg, Rider Strong, and Julia Pistell started Literary Disco, a podcast about books and writing. It is now part of the LitHub Radio Network and was recently named one of the top literary podcasts by the Washington Post. He is also the co-host of Open Book, along with Maggie Downs, a popular radio interview show in the Coachella Valley on KCOD-FM. In 2021, Goldberg & Downs were named finalist for the Intercollegiate Broadcasting System's Award for Best Community Volunteer Program/Personality.

In 2016, he collaborated with Brad Meltzer on the novel The House of Secrets, also an instant New York Times bestseller.  That same year, he was awarded the Silver Pen Award by the Nevada Writers Hall of Fame, which is awarded to a mid-career writer with profound ties to the state of Nevada.

His next novel, Gangster Nation, released in 2017, continued the story of Sal Cupertine/Rabbi David Cohen, picking up two years after Gangsterland's conclusion. The book received glowing reviews in Kirkus, Publishers Weekly, Booklist, Mystery Scene Magazine, the Orange County Register, and numerous other outlets. Both novels were optioned by Caryn Mandabach Productions   and later by Amazon Studios.The Low Desert: Gangster Stories, a "Gangster Universe" anthology, introduces new characters and revisits those from Gangsterland and Gangster Nation. It received a starred and boxed review in Publishers Weekly, a starred review in Kirkus, a rave review in the Los Angeles Times, was named a top 10 book of Spring by Publishers Weekly, a top 20 book of winter by USA Today, and a most anticipated book of the year by CrimeReads.

In addition to his fiction, Goldberg has served as a book and cultural critic for several weekly newspapers in Las Vegas, including the Mercury, CityLife, and The Weekly, earning five Nevada Press Association Awards. He has also written for USA Today, the Los Angeles Times, and the Los Angeles Review of Books, among many others.

Personal life
He is a professor of creative writing at the University of California, Riverside where he founded and directs the Low Residency MFA in Creative Writing & Writing for the Performing Arts. Previously, as an instructor of creative writing at the University of California, Los Angeles Extension Writers' Program, he was named Teacher of the Year in 2005. He is the brother of New York Times bestselling novelist and TV writer/producer Lee Goldberg and authors Linda Woods and Karen Dinino, as well as the nephew of true crime author and novelist Burl Barer, and the son of journalist and author Jan Curran and television broadcast journalist Alan Goldberg. He grew up in Walnut Creek, California and Palm Springs, California and currently lives in Indio, California with his wife, Wendy Duren, also a writer.

References

External links
 Tod Goldberg's Official Website
 Tod Goldberg's Blog
 OV Books Page
 Interview in SmokeLong Quarterly Short Story "This Is What You Left Behind" in SmokeLong Quarterly Review Los Angeles Times Review of Other Resort Cities''
 Jewish Journal: "So Many Authors, So Little Time"

1971 births
21st-century American novelists
American male novelists
Jewish American writers 
Living people
Writers from Palm Springs, California
Palm Springs High School people
People from La Quinta, California
21st-century American male writers
Novelists from California
21st-century American Jews